Tony Ward (born 5 December 1941 in Highgate, London) is a former football referee and assistant referee. During his career he officiated in the English Football League and Premier League, as well as in FIFA-sanctioned matches. He resided in New Southgate, London.

Career
Ward started his career in 1962, serving the South East Counties, Spartan, Athenian and Isthmian leagues, before becoming a Football League linesman in 1974.  His first match was a Second Division game between Portsmouth and Nottingham Forest. In 1980, he was promoted to the  Referees List of the Football League; his first match was between Lincoln City and Wigan Athletic.

Ward reached the normal retirement age of 48 in 1990, but he was retained for a further three seasons along with other high-performing referees. He did not have Premier League appointments initially on its formation in 1992-1993 but was regularly chosen for matches in the second half of the season. His final match was Liverpool v Coventry City in April 1993.

When Arsenal moved from Highbury to the Emirates Stadium in 2006, he was appointed Arsenal’s Hon Referees Liaison Officer.

Appointments
Ward's notable appointments include: 
FA trophy Final at Wembley between Altrincham and Runcorn
FA Vase Final 1979
Football League Cup Semifinal 1993
West Germany vs Brazil (Linesman) 1981
Reserve referee football league cup final 1989
Linesman European cup winners cup final 1989 Barcelona vs Sampdoria (referee George Courtney)

Testimonial Matches
In addition to Robin Wainwright and George Parish, Ward refereed testimonial matches for:
Glenn Hoddle
Ossie Ardiles
Pat Jennings
Ray Clemence
Chris Hughton
Ron "Chopper" Harris
Tony Gale
Ray Kennedy
Graham Rix
Tony Adams
Ron Hillyard
Terry Gibson
Barry Fry
Danny Blanchflower
Eddie Baily
David O'Leary
Michael Watson
Alan Nelmes
Mick Leach
Ray Kennedy
Keith Millen
Tony Gale

Deliberate handball
Ward became the first referee to dismiss a player for deliberate handball when he sent off Reading player Lawrie Sanchez in a match against Oxford in August 1982.  Ten days later he dismissed Colin Todd of Nottingham Forest against Manchester United; Todd became the first Division One player to be sent off for handball.

Numbers board
As fourth official for England v Ireland in 1986 Ward was the first official to use the numbers board for substitutions, the referee was Clive Thomas of Wales.

Private life
He married in August 1963, and has two children and four grandchildren.  He worked for 35 years for Mirror Group Newspapers.  He is a keen follower of cricket and baseball.

References
 Football League Handbooks 1974–1992
 Rothmans Year Books 1980 - 1992

1941 births
Living people
English football referees
People from Highgate